Joseph Tilford Lee Greene (born February 17, 1967 at Wright-Patterson Air Base, Dayton, Ohio) was an American track and field athlete who competed mainly in the long jump.

Greene attended Stebbins High School in Riverside, a suburb of Dayton, and The Ohio State University.

He competed for the United States in the 1992 Summer Olympics held in Barcelona, Spain in the long jump where he won the bronze medal. He repeated this performance four years later winning a second bronze in the Men's long jump at the 1996 Summer Olympics held in Atlanta, United States. Both competitions were won by Carl Lewis.

In August 2008, Greene's 1996 Olympic bronze medal was available for auction on eBay. Both the 1996 Atlanta and 1992 Barcelona bronze medals were also briefly seen on the History Channel show Pawn Stars.

References

External links
 
 Joe Greene profile at USATF
 Ohio State bio
 Track and Field News

American male long jumpers
Olympic bronze medalists for the United States in track and field
Athletes (track and field) at the 1992 Summer Olympics
Athletes (track and field) at the 1996 Summer Olympics
1967 births
Living people
Medalists at the 1996 Summer Olympics
Medalists at the 1992 Summer Olympics
Sportspeople from Dayton, Ohio